The Focke-Wulf A 20 Habicht (German: "Hawk") was an airliner developed in Germany in the late 1920s. It was a high-wing cantilever monoplane with fixed tailskid undercarriage. The fuselage was deep and seated four passengers in a fully enclosed cabin. The type was not bought by the airlines and only a few examples were built.

Variants
A.20standard version with Mercedes D.II engine.
A.20aone-off version with Wright Whirlwind engine, for export.
A.28version with Bristol Titan engine.

Specifications (A.20)

References

Further reading

External links
 German aircraft between 1919 and 1945

1920s German airliners
A 20
Single-engined tractor aircraft
High-wing aircraft
Aircraft first flown in 1927